"Lasse redn" (colloquial for standard German "Lass sie reden" - Let 'em talk) is a song by the German rock band Die Ärzte. It is the fourth track and the third single released from their 2007 album Jazz ist anders. The song is optimistic about people who gossip about other people, implying that rumours don't mean anything.

Music video
In the video, a man (played by Martin Klempnow) mimes what Farin sings, first in a little room and then on a stage where  dancers appear. Also tied-up cooks from the cover of "Jazz ist anders" appear on both sides of the stage, which are parodies of the bondage comics heroine Sweet Gwendoline, who has been used as the band's mascot. While on the stage, a woman in a small circle in the corner of the screen is gesturing along with the man miming. The band doesn't appear in the video, except for a while as thumbs with clothes on and faces on them.

Personnel
Farin Urlaub - guitar, vocals
Rodrigo González - bass, keyboard
Bela B. - drums

Track list
"Lasse redn" (Let 'em talk) – 2:49
"Komm zu Papa" (Come to papa) – 3:52
"Nichts gesehen (Economy-Version)" (Didn't see anything) – 1:03
"Wir waren die Besten (Economy-Version)" (We were the best) – 4:03
"Lasse redn" (video) – 2:50

Charts

Weekly charts

Year-end charts

References

2008 singles
Die Ärzte songs
Songs written by Farin Urlaub
2007 songs